Zain Afzal (Urdu : زین افضل) is a Pakistani actor. He is mostly known for his comedy roles. He is best known for playing the role "Taimoor" in Sanwari. He also acted in the film Ready Steady No. He also known for Senti Aur Mental. In 2018, Zain was also invited on celebrity talkshow Mazaaq Raat.

Early life and education 
Zain Afzal was born in Lahore. Zain studied his school in Lahore Grammar School based in Lahore. Then later on he moved to Beaconhouse National University in Lahore.

Career 

Afzal started his career with the award-winning film "Zinda Bhaag" in which he played a small role. Then in 2015 he appeared in a Pakistani horror film "Maya" which was his first big commercial project. He was then chosen to act in Senti Aur Mental in which he got the leading roles instead of Yasir Hussain. He was also chosen to act in a comedy film "Ready Steady No" which was of Hum Films.

Filmography

Film

Television

Webseries

References

External links

Pakistani male film actors
Living people
Pakistani male television actors
1990 births